On 22 March 2019, a man drove a car into pedestrians in Zaoyang, Hubei, China, killing six people. Police shot him dead. The driver was later identified as 44-year-old Cui Lidong who was known to police as a previous offender. He is said to have carried daggers in his car at the time.

References 

2019 road incidents
2019 murders in China
2010s road incidents in Asia
21st-century mass murder in China
History of Hubei
March 2019 crimes in Asia
March 2019 events in China
Mass murder in 2019
Vehicular rampage in China
Xiangyang